Barabajan Poems, 1492–1992 is a collection of various types of writing, authored by the Barbados postcolonial author Kamau Brathwaite and published by Savacou Publications in 1994.

In this collection, readers experience a number of Brathwaite's overwhelming ordeals in his recent life, shared honestly and sincerely. It is not only autobiographical but also represents a community defined by a Caribbean culture in transition from colonialism to a modernized independent economic state within the "new world order". It is fictionally and spiritually a magic book, serving as a counterweight to Prospero's books of magic in Shakespeare's playThe Tempest, and is a foil for the bygone landlords Christopher Columbus (1992 was the Columbus Quincentenary) and the fictional Prospero.

Sycorax the muse
In an attempt to give voice to unspoken indigenous cultures, Brathwaite's postcolonial poems outline the history of the Caribbean through Sycorax's eyes. Sycorax is presented as Brathwaite's muse, possessing him and his computer to give full voice to the history of the silenced, who in Brathwaite's philosophy are not only Caribbean natives, but any culture under-represented during the colonial period.

According to Brathwaite, "[W]hat happened to Caliban in The Tempest was that his alliances were laughable, his alliances were fatal, his alliances were ridiculous. He chose the wrong people to make God." Brathwaite "considered Sycorax, Caliban's mother, 'a paradigm for all women of the Third World, who have not yet, despite all the effort, reached that trigger of visibility which is necessary for a whole society.'"

About the author
Kamau Brathwaite (11 May 1930 – 4 February 2020)  was a Barbadian poet and academic, widely considered one of the major voices in the Caribbean literary canon. Formerly a professor of Comparative Literature at New York University, Brathwaite was the 2006 International Winner of the Griffin Poetry Prize, for his volume of poetry Born to Slow Horses. He was a recipient of the Order of Barbados.

Brathwaite held a Ph.D. from the University of Sussex (1968) and was the co-founder of the Caribbean Artists Movement (CAM). He received both the Guggenheim and Fulbright Fellowships in 1983, and was a winner of the 1994 Neustadt International Prize for Literature, the Bussa Award, the Casa de las Américas Prize for poetry, and the 1999 Charity Randall Citation for Performance and Written Poetry from the International Poetry Forum.

Brathwaite was noted for his studies of Black cultural life both in Africa and throughout the African diasporas of the world in works such as Folk Culture of the Slaves in Jamaica (1970); The Development of Creole Society in Jamaica, 1770–1820 (1971); Contradictory Omens (1974); Afternoon of the Status Crow (1982); and History of the Voice (1984), the publication of which established him as the authority of note on nation language.

References

External links
 Many works of Caribbean Literature openly available through the Digital Library of the Caribbean.

Further reading
Jonathan Goldberg, Tempest in the Caribbean, pages 89, 90ff.
Gordon Collier (ed.) and various other editors, The Cross-Cultural Legacy, pages 177, 178, 179.
(2004) Poems by Kamau Brathwaite, Review: Literature and Arts of the Americas, 37:1, 56–64, Taylor & Francis. 

1994 poetry books
African diaspora literature
Caribbean literature
North American literature
South American literature